"Without You" is a song written by Joe West and Dave Pahanish and recorded by Australian country music artist Keith Urban.  It was released in February 2011 as the second single from Urban's 2010 album Get Closer.  The song reached number one on the U.S. Billboard Hot Country Songs chart.

This song should not to be confused with another song of the same title that Urban had recorded on his Australian self-titled 1991 debut album.

Background
Urban described the song as his "life story" and considered it "an amazing song that [he] would have never allowed [himself] to write."

Content
"Without You" is a ballad in which the narrator says that his life would not have any meaning without his lover. This song is set in the key of A-flat major and is accompanied mainly by acoustic guitar, banjo and fiddle. It has a main chord pattern of A-A/G-Dsus2/F-D and a vocal range from E4 to F5.

Critical reception
Matt Bjorke of Roughstock gave the song five stars out of five, citing it a song that "suits Keith Urban and his life with wife Nicole Kidman." Blake Boldt of Engine 145 gave the song a "thumbs down," stating that Urban is "at his best when exploring heart's aches and pains," and saying that it "lacks the excitement of past hits."

Music video
The video for the song was directed by Chris Hicky. Filmed entirely in black-and-white, it shows Urban performing the song while seated on a stool in an empty bedroom, while home footage of his personal and professional life is shown projected onto the background. Keith would use this same setup (complete with black-and-white lighting) for his performance of the song at the 2011 ACM Awards.

Chart performance
"Without You" debuted at number 47 on the Billboard Hot Country Songs charts for the week of 19 February 2011. It also debuted at number 95 on the U.S. Billboard Hot 100 chart for the week of 26 March 2011.

Year-end charts

Certifications

References

2010 songs
Keith Urban songs
2011 singles
Song recordings produced by Dann Huff
Songs written by Dave Pahanish
Capitol Records Nashville singles
Music videos directed by Chris Hicky
Country ballads
Black-and-white music videos